Baron Lurgan, of Lurgan in the County of Armagh, was a title in the Peerage of the United Kingdom. It was created in 1839 for Charles Brownlow, who had previously represented Armagh in the House of Commons. His son, the 2nd Baron, served as a Government Whip from 1869 to 1874 in the first Liberal administration of William Gladstone and was also Lord Lieutenant of Armagh. The title became extinct in 1991 on the death of the latter's great-grandson, the 5th Baron.

Barons Lurgan (1839)
Charles Brownlow, 1st Baron Lurgan (1795–1847)
Charles Brownlow, 2nd Baron Lurgan (1831–1882)
William Brownlow, 3rd Baron Lurgan (1858–1937)
William George Edward Brownlow, 4th Baron Lurgan (1902–1984)
John Desmond Cavendish Brownlow, 5th Baron Lurgan (1911–1991)

Arms

References

Extinct baronies in the Peerage of the United Kingdom
Noble titles created in 1839
Noble titles created for UK MPs
Brownlow family